The 103rd Regiment of Foot (King's Irish Infantry) was a British Army regiment raised in 1781. Ralph Abercromby was colonel, of the regiment throughout its existence. It served entirely in Ireland before being disbanded in 1784.

References

External links

Infantry regiments of the British Army
Military units and formations disestablished in 1784
Military units and formations established in 1781